Salma Abohegazy (born 10 April 2003) is an Egyptian parataekwondo practitioner. She competed at the 2020 Summer Paralympics in the –58 kg category reaching the quarterfinal.

References

External links
 

2003 births
Living people
Egyptian female taekwondo practitioners
Taekwondo practitioners at the 2020 Summer Paralympics
21st-century Egyptian women